Crawfordsville is a census-designated place and unincorporated community in Linn County, Oregon, United States. As of the 2010 census it had a population of 332. It has a post office with a ZIP code of 97336.

Demographics

History
Crawfordsville was founded on the land of Philemon Vawter Crawford in 1870 by Crawford and Robert Glass. When the post office was established in 1870, it was named for Crawford. Crawford was born in Madison, Indiana, in 1814 and he arrived in Oregon via the Oregon Trail in 1851. His son, Jasper V. Crawford, was the first postmaster. Philemon Crawford had previously helped establish the Boston Flour Mill near Shedd.

In 1915 Crawfordsville had a population of 300, two sawmills, a flouring mill, a high school, an elementary school, and three churches.

In the early 20th century, Crawfordsville had a population of Sikhs from Pakistan and India who worked for the Calapooya Lumber Company.

Education
Crawfordsville Elementary School, part of the Sweet Home School District, closed in 2011, 158 years after its founding in 1853.  Area elementary students now attend Holley Elementary School in Holley.

Points of interest
The Crawfordsville Bridge over the Calapooia River is listed on the National Register of Historic Places.

References

External links
Historic images of Crawfordsville from Salem Public Library
Images of Crawfordsville from Flickr
History of Crawfordsville from Linn County Roots
History of the Finley Mill in Crawfordsville from Linn Genealogical Society

Census-designated places in Oregon
Unincorporated communities in Linn County, Oregon
1870 establishments in Oregon
Populated places established in 1870
Census-designated places in Linn County, Oregon
Unincorporated communities in Oregon